Sertanense Futebol Clube, formerly Sertanense Foot-ball Club, is a Portuguese football club based in Sertã. Founded in 1934, it currently plays in the Campeonato de Portugal, holding home games at Campo de Jogos Dr. Marques dos Santos.

History
The largest sports club of Sertã after Vitória de Sernache, in the Castelo Branco district, Sertanense was founded by Casimiro Farinha on February 17, 1934, eventually resorting exclusively to football, after devoting most of its energy to sport fishing, collecting some national trophies.

Twice district champion, in 1998 and 2000, it first reached the third level of national football in 2009. That summer, former Portugal U-20 goalkeeper José Bizarro – winner of the 1989 FIFA World Youth Championship – took charge of the team. In that and the previous season's domestic cup, the club faced first division club FC Porto, being ousted 0–4 on both occasions (one at home).

Current squad

Appearances
Tier 3, Segunda Divisão: 3 (highest rank: 5th)
Tier 4, Terceira Divisão: 18 (1 title)
Taça de Portugal: 21

Season to season

Honours
Castelo Branco District Championship
Champions (2): 1987–88, 1999–2000
Terceira Divisão
Champions (1): 2008–09

References

External links
Official site 
ZeroZero team profile
ForeDeJogo team profile 
Sertanense blog

Association football clubs established in 1934
Football clubs in Portugal